Mary Greene may refer to:

 Mary Greene (nun) (1843–1933), Irish-born Catholic nun and educator
 Mary Becker Greene (1867–1949), steamboat captain of the Greene Line of river steamboats
 Mary Shepard Greene (1869–1958), American artist, illustrator and jewelry designer
 Mary Ann Greene, American lawyer, writer, and lecturer

See also
Mary Green (disambiguation)